Royal Swedish Yacht Club (KSSS), is the largest and oldest yacht club in Sweden and one of the five oldest in the world, formed 15 May 1830. KSSS is also the oldest yacht club in Continental Europe.

Activities include racing, training, education, squadron sailing, match racing and club activities. KSSS also operates the port and has its own ports in Saltsjöbaden and Sandhamn.

The first regatta KSSS organized took place on 12 September 1833, and the first regatta with prizes in 1854. Every year the KSSS organizes the Round Gotland Race sailed around Gotland, and the Sandhams Regatta at Sandön, in the Stockholm archipelago.

They were the Challenger of Record for the 2013 America's Cup, where they were represented by Artemis Racing. Artemis Racing also completed in the 2017 America's Cup, where they were defeated by Emirates Team New Zealand in the Louis Vuitton Cup finals.

See also

List of International Council of Yacht Clubs members
Segelsällskapet Fjord

References

External links

Official site

Royal Swedish Yacht Club
Royal Swedish Yacht Club
1830 establishments in Sweden
Sport in Stockholm
Sports clubs established in 1830
Yacht clubs in Sweden